Richard Colvin is a Canadian foreign service officer who gained public attention as a witness in the Canadian Afghan detainee issue. He appeared before the Special Committee on the Canadian Mission in Afghanistan in late 2009 where he discussed a signed affidavit alleging that Afghan detainees turned over to Afghanistan prisons by Canadian soldiers were tortured. The events surrounding this issue, and the Conservative government's response to his testimony, were, according to many opposition politicians, closely related to the widespread anti-prorogation protests.

Early life

Colvin was born in 1969 in a village near Coventry, Great Britain, where he lived until the age of 16, when his family migrated to Canada, settling near Waterdown, Ontario. He studied international relations and Russian language at the University of Toronto, and in 1992 joined the Canadian foreign service after passing his second attempt at the foreign service exam. In 2002, he was posted to Ramallah in the Palestinian territories, where he served on a new political mission established in the wake of Yasser Arafat's death. He was posted back to Calgary in 2005 where he served before being posted to Afghanistan.

As a witness in the Afghan detainee issue

On October 6, 2009, the lawyer for Colvin (called to testify at a hearing into allegations of Afghan prison torture) said that the Conservative government was trying to keep her client silent. In a letter sent to the Canadian Department of Justice and obtained by CBC News, lawyer Lori Bokenfohr said the government invoked the national security order in response to Colvin's decision to co-operate with the Military Police Complaints Commission.

Claims
During his testimony to a Parliamentary committee in November 2009, Colvin said Canada did not monitor detainee conditions in Afghanistan and that detainees transferred by Canadians to Afghan prisons were likely tortured. "According to our information, the likelihood is that all the Afghans we handed over were tortured", Colvin said. "For interrogators in Kandahar, it was a standard operating procedure". Colvin worked in Kandahar in 2006 before moving to Kabul. He said his reports were ignored and he was eventually told to stop putting the reports in writing.

Reception
Colvin’s testimony at the Parliamentary committee was controversial. Some political commentators took a negative stance, arguing his credibility was “…politely but steadily chipped away by evidence from other witnesses that included three former Canadian ambassadors to Afghanistan and other senior officials from the Department of Foreign Affairs and International Trade who were assigned to the Afghanistan file, a representative from the Correctional Service of Canada (who was in Kandahar and made 47 visits to prisons, most of them unannounced) and by a number of serving and retired general officers.” A 2015 review by the Canadian Centre for Policy Alternatives and Rideau Institute supports Colvin's conclusions and notes the efforts made by elected officials and civil servants to suppress his criticism. Another study concludes that Colvin's evidence was supported by other observers and that his disclosures had been politicized by the government of the day in an effort to minimize public relations damage, including ordering his silence and attacking him personally in Parliament. He alleged a number of reprisals as a result of his disclosures; the outcome of his complaints was not covered in the media, but he retained his position.

See also

2010 Canada anti-prorogation protests
 Bagram torture and prisoner abuse
Canadian Afghan detainee issue
 Canada's role in the invasion of Afghanistan
 Canadian Forces casualties in Afghanistan
 Criticism of the War on Terrorism
 International public opinion on the war in Afghanistan
 Opposition to the War in Afghanistan (2001–present)
 Protests against the invasion of Afghanistan
 Timeline of the Canadian Afghan detainee issue
 War in Afghanistan (2001–present)

References

External links

Videos
 Canada's pro-democracy movement (includes footage of Colvin) Produced by Jesse Freeston, January 29, 2010; Publisher: The Real News (duration: 10:36)

1969 births
Living people
English emigrants to Canada
University of Western Ontario alumni
University of Toronto alumni